Phyllurus ossa, also known as the Mackay Coast leaf-tailed gecko is a gecko found in Australia. It is endemic to Mount Ossa National Park and Dryander National Park in mideastern Queensland.

References

Phyllurus
Geckos of Australia
Endemic fauna of Australia
Reptiles described in 1993
Taxa named by Patrick J. Couper
Taxa named by Jeanette Covacevich
Taxa named by Craig Moritz